The 2007 Sedgefield by-election was a by-election held on 19 July 2007 for the House of Commons constituency of Sedgefield in County Durham.  The Ealing Southall by-election was also held on 19 July.

The by-election was triggered when Tony Blair, the Labour Party Member of Parliament (MP) for Sedgefield and former Prime Minister, resigned to become envoy for the international diplomatic Quartet on the Middle East. Blair accepted the office of Steward and Bailiff of the Three Hundreds of Chiltern, thereby disqualifying himself from Parliament and causing the by-election.  Blair had held the constituency since its creation for the 1983 election, and Labour had held its predecessor constituencies since the 1935 election.

According to Sedgefield Borough Council, the electorate for the by-election was 67,339 which represents an increase of 673 (1%) on the 2005 general election.

Candidates
The Labour Party selected Phil Wilson, a public relations consultant, local party member and one of the "Famous Five" who had promoted Tony Blair's first candidacy in 1983. He was chosen from a shortlist of five candidates, including former Minister Melanie Johnson. The Liberal Democrats chose North East regeneration expert Greg Stone, a councillor in Newcastle-upon-Tyne and former candidate in the Vale of York in the 2001 election and Newcastle-upon-Tyne Central in the 2005 election. The Conservatives stood Graham Robb, a public relations consultant and former radio presenter, who stood for the party in 1992 in Hartlepool, losing to Peter Mandelson.

Several other candidates contested the election. The UK Independence Party (UKIP) selected Toby Horton, who formerly contested the seat for the Conservatives in 1983, and in 1992 stood in Rother Valley. The Green Party of England and Wales chose Chris Haine, and the British National Party chose Andrew Spence, who was involved in the 2000 fuel protests and stood for UKIP in the seat in 2001. The leader of the Official Monster Raving Loony Party, Alan Hope, also stood, having previously contested a long list of seats in both general and by-elections. The English Democrats chose Stephen Gash, and Operation Christian Vote fielded barrister Tim Grainger. Norman Scarth stood as an independent "anti crime" candidate, having previously contested Chesterfield in 1997 as an "independent old age pensioner". Local independent councillor Paul Gittins stood on a platform calling for the regeneration of the centre of Newton Aycliffe.

Result
Wilson held the seat for Labour with a majority reduced by over 11,000. The Liberal Democrats overtook the Conservatives for second place, with an 11% swing. The British National Party and independent local campaigner Paul Gittins both retained their deposits.

General Election 2005 result

References

External links
BBC News
Labour's Sedgefield By-Election Website
Liberal Democrats Sedgefield By-Election Website
Conservative Sedgefield By-Election Website
By-Election blog
Sedgefield UK Independence Party
Election leaflets from the by-election campaign

Sedgefield by-election
Sedgefield by-election
Sedgefield
Sedgefield (borough)
2000s in County Durham
Sedgefield by-election